The 2009–10 UCI Track Cycling World Cup Classics is a multi race tournament over a season of track cycling. The season ran from 30 October 2009 to 24 January 2010. The World Cup was organised by the Union Cycliste Internationale.

The World Cup kicked off in Manchester, Great Britain, then moved to Melbourne, Australia, from 19 to 21 November.

As in the previous season, there were also rounds at the Alcides Nieto Patiño Velodrome in Cali, Colombia, from 10 to 11 December 2009, and in Beijing, China, from 22 to 24 January 2010.

Unlike previous year, there was no World Cup event in Copenhagen, Denmark, but that was the venue for the 2010 UCI Track Cycling World Championships, which took place from 24 to 28 March.

Overall team standings
Overall team standings are calculated based on total number of points gained by the team's riders in each event. The top ten teams after round 4 are listed below:

Results

Men

Women

See also

 2009–10 UCI Track Cycling World Ranking

References

External links

UCI events schedule

 
World Cup Classics
World Cup Classics
UCI Track Cycling World Cup